Colonel Herbert Mercer (4 January 1862 – 8 February 1944) was a British Army officer and a Conservative politician and member of parliament in the 1920s.

Early life
Mercer was born on 7 January 1862 in Boxley, Kent, the son of Richard Mercer, a banker. He was educated at Harrow School and entered Trinity College, Cambridge in 1880.

Military career
Mercer was commissioned in April 1881 as a second lieutenant in the Duke of Edinburgh's Own Edinburgh militia. In January 1884 he was appointed as a lieutenant in the 3rd Dragoon Guards. Later as a major he served in the Boer War. During the First World War he commanded the 3rd Reserve Regiment.

Parliamentary politics
Mercer was returned as the Member of Parliament for the Sudbury Division of Suffolk for the 1922 general election. He lost the seat in the 1923 election to Liberal politician John Frederick Loverseed.

Death
Mercer died on 8 February 1944 at Rotherfield, and was buried at Stradishall. He had married in 1906 Elizabeth Bower, daughter of Thomas Bower of Stradishall Place, Suffolk.

References

External links 
 

1862 births
1944 deaths
Conservative Party (UK) MPs for English constituencies
UK MPs 1922–1923
3rd Dragoon Guards officers
British Army personnel of the Second Boer War
British Army personnel of World War I
Alumni of Trinity College, Cambridge
People from Boxley